The France national roller hockey team is the national team side of France at international roller hockey. Usually it is part of FIRS Roller Hockey World Cup and CERH European Roller Hockey Championship.

France squad - 64th Nations Cup 

Team Staff
 General Manager: Philippe Aubre
 General Manager: Dan Mortreux
 Physiotherapist: Hedi Ben Brahim

Coaching Staff
 Head Coach: Fabien Savreux
 Assistant: Thierry Cadet

Titles

References

External links
Official website of France Roller Sports Federation

National Roller Hockey Team
Roller hockey
National roller hockey (quad) teams